Giuseppe Antonini (2 September 1914 – 29 November 1989) was an Italian professional footballer, who played as a midfielder, and football manager.

External links 
Profile at MagliaRossonera.it 

1914 births
1989 deaths
Footballers from Verona
Italian footballers
Italian football managers
Association football midfielders
Serie A players
Serie B players
Hellas Verona F.C. players
A.C. Milan players
A.C. Reggiana 1919 players
Piacenza Calcio 1919 managers